Rovers Football Club was a 19th-century football club based in Glasgow.

History

The club was founded on 22 April 1873.  It was very active in its first season of football, claiming 10 wins from 19 games.

Rovers was one of the original 16 teams to participate in the inaugural season of the Scottish Cup.  It took part in Scottish Cup tournaments between 1873–74 and 1877–78, reaching the quarter-finals on two occasions.  The first time the club reached the last eight was in 1874–75, and it did so without playing a match in the tournament - accepting a walkover from Hamilton F.C. in the first round and receiving a bye in the second round, before scratching to eventual winners Queen's Park.

The following season the club reached the quarter-finals - that season, the final seven - on merit, with wins over the Glasgow side West End and the 3rd Edinburgh Rifle Volunteers F.C., but losing to Vale of Leven; the game at Alexandria ended early because of bad light but Rovers agreed that the result should stand.

In 1877, the club took over the Winton club of Mount Florida.  However the club does not seem to have survived the season.  

Rovers F.C. should not be confused with other Scottish teams of the same name, such as Rovers F.C. (1872–1882) in Edinburgh, or Rovers F.C. (1888–1889) in the Scottish Highlands.

Colours

The club played in blue jerseys with a white cross, white knickerbockers, and blue stockings, supplied by Forsyths of Renfield Street.  It is not known whether the cross was one of St Andrew or a Maltese cross, which was a popular design on football jerseys at the time.

Grounds

The club played at the following grounds:

1873–75: South Side Park/Queen's Park, Glasgow
1876–78: Victoria Road, Glasgow

External links
Scottish Football Club Directory
RSSSF: Scottish Cup

References

Defunct football clubs in Scotland
Football clubs in Glasgow
Association football clubs established in 1873
Association football clubs disestablished in 1878
1873 establishments in Scotland
1878 disestablishments in Scotland